Kaidatsky Bridge Kaidaky Bridge is a bridge over Dnieper in the city of Dnipro, Ukraine. The bridge connects right (Novokodatskyi District) and left (Amur-Nyzhnodniprovskyi District) banks of Dnipro and is part of the European route E50.

The bridge is named after an old Zaporizhian Cossack settlement, Novi Kodaky (Kaidaky). The crossing across Dnieper existed since at least the 17th century.

The bridge stretches over an island Namystanka. The island is part of Sukhachivka arboretum (also known as Diyivka Park) and administered by the Dnipro State Forestry.

See also
 Bridges in Dnipro

References

External links
 Kaidatsky Bridge (Кайдацький міст). Zruchno.Travel.
 Dnipropetrovsk bridges: are we waiting for trouble to happen? (ДНЕПРОПЕТРОВСКИЕ МОСТЫ - ДОЖДЕМСЯ ЛИ БЕДЫ?). UAavto.dp.ua

Road bridges in Dnipro
Bridges over the Dnieper
European route E50
Bridges completed in 1982
1982 establishments in Ukraine